The 1971–72 Cypriot Second Division was the 17th season of the Cypriot second-level football league. Evagoras Paphos won their 2nd title.

Format
Fourteen teams participated in the 1971–72 Cypriot Second Division. All teams played against each other twice, once at their home and once away. The team with the most points at the end of the season crowned champions. The first three teams were  promoted to 1972–73 Cypriot First Division.

Changes from previous season
Teams promoted to 1971–72 Cypriot First Division
 APOP Paphos FC

Teams relegated to 1971–72 Cypriot Third Division
 LALL Lysi

Teams relegated from 1970–71 Cypriot First Division
 ASIL Lysi

Teams promoted from 1970–71 Cypriot Third Division
 Keravnos Strovolou FC
 Ethnikos Achna FC

Moreover, Enosis Panelliniou-Antaeus Limassol (EPAL) absorbed from Aris Limassol FC.

League standings

See also
 Cypriot Second Division
 1971–72 Cypriot First Division
 1971–72 Cypriot Cup

References

Cypriot Second Division seasons
Cyprus
1971–72 in Cypriot football